The Beaches are a Canadian rock band formed in Toronto in 2013. Named after the Toronto neighbourhood where three of the four members grew up, the band consists of Jordan Miller (lead vocals, bass), Kylie Miller (guitar), Leandra Earl (keyboards, guitar), and Eliza Enman-McDaniel (drums, percussion). The band released two EPs, The Beaches (2013) and Heights (2014), before releasing their debut album Late Show (2017) and winning the 2018 Juno Award for Breakthrough Group of the Year. Following their debut album, they released two further EPs, The Professional (2019) and Future Lovers (2021). Both EPs were combined into Sisters Not Twins (The Professional Lovers Album), which won the Juno Award for Rock Album of the Year in 2022.

History

Formation and early EPs (2011-2016) 
In their early teens, sisters Jordan and Kylie Miller joined Eliza Enman-McDaniel and guitarist Megan Fitchett to form the pop punk quartet Done with Dolls in their hometown of Toronto. The band undertook a tour in 2011 opening for Allstar Weekend, and performed the theme song to the Family Channel teen sitcom Really Me. By 2013, Fitchett had departed the group and the group reformed under the name The Beaches, referencing the neighbourhood of Toronto where the Millers and Enman-McDaniel grew up. The band also gained a new member, Leandra Earl (from Toronto's Little Italy neighbourhood), and adopted a guitar rock sound. The Beaches released two EPs, The Beaches (2013) and Heights (2014), before signing to Universal Music's subsidiary Island Records in 2016.

Late Show (2017-2018) 
They released their debut full-length studio album Late Show in 2017. The album was produced by Emily Haines and James Shaw of Metric and was supported by two singles, "Money" and "T-Shirt". "T-Shirt" peaked at number one on Billboard Canada Rock chart and was certified Gold by Music Canada in 2021. The band won Breakthrough Group of the Year at the Juno Awards of 2018. Later that year, they received a SOCAN Songwriting Prize nomination for their song "Money".

Sisters Not Twins (The Professional Lovers Album) (2019-present) 
In 2019, the band released its third EP, The Professional. It was accompanied by the singles "Fascination" and "Snake Tongue". They toured Canada, opening for The Glorious Sons and Passion Pit. The band was selected as the opening act for the only Canadian stop on the Rolling Stones' 2019 No Filter Tour. On November 24, 2019, they appeared as the on-field pre-game entertainment before the kick-off of the 107th Grey Cup in Calgary, performing "Fascination" and "T-Shirt". They later announced a 2020 headlining tour of Canada. 

In 2021, they released their fourth EP, Future Lovers, accompanied by the singles "Let's Go" and "Blow Up". The EP consists of songs originally intended for their second album that they decided to release sooner. They also announced the 2022 "Future Lovers" tour, which has 20 dates across Canada and have The Blue Stones as special guests. The band combined the two EPs into Sisters Not Twins (The Professional Lovers Album), which then won the Juno Award for Rock Album of the Year in 2022. In 2022, the Beaches released three further singles: "Grow Up Tomorrow", "Orpheus", and "My People".

Discography

Studio albums
Late Show (2017)
Sisters Not Twins (The Professional Lovers Album) (2022)
combines The Professional and Future Lovers EPs

EPs
The Beaches (2013)
Heights (2014)
The Professional (2019)
Future Lovers (2021)

Singles

Music videos

Awards and nominations

References

External links

Canadian alternative rock groups
Musical groups from Toronto
Musical groups established in 2013
All-female bands
Juno Award for Breakthrough Group of the Year winners
2013 establishments in Ontario
Juno Award for Rock Album of the Year winners